Aliya Alla Magala Ganda is a 1997 Indian Kannada film adapted from the 1988 Tamil film Idhu Namma Aalu and directed by Y. Yesudas.

The film starring Jaggesh, Udaya Bhanu and Pramila Joshai in the lead roles revolves around Raja, an orphan, who relocates to a maternal village and falls in love with the daughter of a henchman with whose help he got a job.

Idhu Namma Aalu had another more similar remake in 2006 titled Ravi Shastry which had Ravichandran in the lead role.

Cast 
Jaggesh
Udaya Bhanu 
Kalyan Kumar
Pramila Joshai
Sundar Raj
Bank Janardhan
Rajaram
M. S. Karnath

Soundtrack 
Record Label: Manoranjan Audio

Music: Rajesh Ramanath

1. Saniha Saniha

2. Thaila Thaila

3. Karanji Karanji

References 

1997 films
Indian comedy films
Kannada remakes of Tamil films
1997 comedy films
1990s Kannada-language films
Films scored by Rajesh Ramnath